The abbreviation CTHS may refer to:

 Cherokee Trail High School in Aurora, Colorado, USA
 Cherrybrook Technology High School in Cherrybrook, New South Wales, Australia
 Canadian Thoroughbred Horse Society, national horse breeding organization
 Comité des travaux historiques et scientifiques, a French learned society
Cass Technical High School in Detroit, Michigan, USA